Audrey Christie (June 27, 1912 – December 19, 1989) was an American actress, singer and dancer.

Early life and family
She was born in Chicago, Illinois, to Charles Christie and Florence Ferguson. 

She attended a fine arts school in Chicago, but she quit school at age 15 after finding success as a performer with the Six Chicago Steppers.

Career
Originally, she worked as a singer and dancer, starting as a teenager in vaudeville shows, but she later acted in dramatic roles as well. Early roles on Broadway included Follow Thru (1929), Sailor, Beware! (1933), The Women (1936), I Married an Angel (1938), and Without Love (1942). She had a lead role in The Desk Set (1956).

She performed in the films Keeper of the Flame (1943), Deadline – U.S.A. (1952), Carousel (1956), Splendor in the Grass (1961), The Unsinkable Molly Brown (1964), Harlow (1965), Frankie and Johnny (1966), The Ballad of Josie (1967), Mame (1974), and Harper Valley PTA (1978). 

Christie acted in several episodes of the anthology TV series Studio One and another TV series, Fair Exchange. During the 1964–1965 television season, she had a recurring role on the situation comedy The Cara Williams Show. In 1975, she appeared on the sitcom Maude, playing the role of Maude’s overbearing mother.

She won a Donaldson Award for her performance in the play The Voice of the Turtle.

Personal life and death
She was married to Guy Robertson, also a performer, and they had a daughter, Christie Jane. 

Her second marriage was to actor Donald Briggs (who was also born in Chicago), who predeceased her. They had a son, Jeffrey; and three grandchildren. 

Christie died of emphysema on December 19, 1989 at her home in West Hollywood, California.

Filmography

Notes

References

External links
 

1910s births
1989 deaths
Year of birth uncertain
Actresses from Chicago
20th-century American actresses
American film actresses
Deaths from emphysema